The BAE Systems Valanx was one of six competitors for a Joint Light Tactical Vehicle that will supplement the Humvee. The Valanx featured lightweight advanced armour and a V shaped hull for crew protection. It was developed with Navistar.

The Valanx was not selected for the Engineering and Manufacturing Development (EMD) phase of the program.

References

External links 
  The Valanx Project Official Website
 DefenseTech website article about The Valanx project

Military vehicles of the United States
Military trucks
Off-road vehicles
Pickup trucks
Military vehicles introduced in the 2010s
Military light utility vehicles